Choi Yun-hui (born 1 September 1967) is a South Korean swimmer who served as the 2nd Vice Minister of Culture, Sports and Tourism under President Moon Jae-in from 2019 to 2020. She is the first woman and second professional sports player to become deputy head of the Ministry or of its preceding agencies. She competed in two events at the 1984 Summer Olympics.

Choi is the younger sister of Choi Yun-jung, who also competed internationally for South Korea in swimming. The two were nicknamed the "Seal Sisters", and were noted frequently for both breaking national backstroke records at the same time. Choi began learning to swim while in kindergarten through lessons at the YMCA. Both sisters attended Seoul National University Middle School, and represented their school in swimming at the national level. Following the 1984 Olympics, she won gold in the 100 m and 200 m backstroke at the 1986 Asian Games.

In 1987, she became the first South Korean model for the Japanese sports drink brand Pocari Sweat. In 2017, she was named the first ever woman to become board member of the Korean Sport & Olympic Committee.

Choi holds both a bachelor's and a master's degree from Yonsei University in physical education.

Notes

References

External links
 

1967 births
Living people
South Korean female backstroke swimmers
South Korean female medley swimmers
Olympic swimmers of South Korea
Swimmers at the 1984 Summer Olympics
Place of birth missing (living people)
Asian Games medalists in swimming
Asian Games gold medalists for South Korea
Asian Games bronze medalists for South Korea
Swimmers at the 1982 Asian Games
Swimmers at the 1986 Asian Games
Medalists at the 1982 Asian Games
Medalists at the 1986 Asian Games
Yonsei University alumni
South Korean government officials
20th-century South Korean women